The 66th Primetime Emmy Awards honored the best in US prime time television programming from June 1, 2013 until May 31, 2014, as chosen by the Academy of Television Arts & Sciences. The ceremony was held on Monday, August 25, 2014, at the Nokia Theatre in Downtown Los Angeles, California, and was broadcast in the U.S. by NBC. Comedian and Late Night host Seth Meyers hosted the ceremony for the first time. The nominations were announced on July 10, 2014.

The scheduling of the Primetime Emmy Awards is coordinated with that of the Creative Arts Emmy Awards ceremony, which was held the previous weekend on August 16, 2014.

Breaking Bad was the major winner of the night, with five wins, including its second Primetime Emmy Award for Outstanding Drama Series for the second part of its fifth season. Modern Family won its fifth consecutive Primetime Emmy Award for Outstanding Comedy Series, tying with Frasier as the series with the most consecutive wins in the category. Gail Mancuso became the first woman in the history of the Primetime Emmy Awards to win the Outstanding Directing Emmy twice after her win for directing the Modern Family episode "Las Vegas". The Amazing Race won its tenth Primetime Emmy Award for Outstanding Reality-Competition Program as well. Other major winners of the night were Sherlock: His Last Vow (3 wins), American Horror Story: Coven and Fargo (2 wins each).

Scheduling of ceremony

The ceremony was held on a night other than Sunday for the first time since 1976 (the 28th Primetime Emmy Awards were also staged on a Monday that year, May 17). The ceremony's unusual date – a Monday night in late August – was due to two factors, primary being NBC's commitment to Sunday Night Football; since acquiring the National Football League's Sunday night game package in 2006, NBC, when it is their turn in the four-network rotation to air the Primetime Emmy Awards, usually schedules the ceremony for the Sunday before Labor Day weekend, to avoid conflicts with SNF in mid-September (when ABC, CBS, or Fox normally air the ceremony). NBC's ideal date on the 2014 calendar for the ceremony (Sunday, August 24) led to the other scheduling factor — MTV's Video Music Awards, which were set for that night more than a year in advance (and would be staged in the L.A. area as well, at The Forum in Inglewood). On January 28, 2014, rather than go head-to-head with the VMA's, NBC announced that the ceremony would take place on Monday, August 25. The move would allow NBC to commit to a preseason Sunday Night Football broadcast for the 24th (a game between the Cincinnati Bengals and Arizona Cardinals); it also ensured the tradition of staging the Primetime Emmy Awards the weekend after the Creative Arts Emmy Awards (that ceremony was already set for August 16).

The ceremony's weeknight date and start time – 5:00 p.m. (PDT) in Los Angeles, California – led to concerns of rush hour traffic gridlock in Los Angeles' downtown core at the time of the ceremony; to help alleviate the concerns, the ATAS worked with Los Angeles city officials to map out street closures and red carpet staging areas, as well as include travel instructions (including which routes to take and where to park) in attendees' ticket packets.

Changes in categories and balloting
On November 14, 2013, the Academy of Television Arts & Sciences announced that it would implement online voting for its members to select the nominees. However, online voting to determine the winners would not be used until 2015, and winners for this year were voted on via paper ballots.

The Academy had also announced changes to several awards and categories that affect both the Primetime and Creative Arts Emmy Awards. Changes for the Primetime Emmy Awards involved separating the Outstanding Miniseries or Movie category into two entities again—Outstanding Miniseries and Outstanding Television Movie. The two were combined in 2011, due to a downtrend in the genres. This separation is only for the program category with all other awards in the category remaining combined between the two formats. The Academy also introduced two new categories—Outstanding Structured Reality Program and Outstanding Unstructured Reality Program.

There was also an increase in the number of longform nominees in writing, directing and performing categories for miniseries/movie (from five to six nominees) as well as a change in their final voting procedures. Additionally, a 2% rule was adopted in the comedy and drama series categories, wherein, a seventh nominee can be added to the respective categories if its total first-round votes are within 2% of the sixth place series.

Winners and nominees

Winners are listed first and highlighted in bold:

Programs

{| class="wikitable"
|+ 
|-
| style="vertical-align:top;" width="50%" | 
 Modern Family (ABC) The Big Bang Theory (CBS)
 Louie (FX)
 Orange Is the New Black (Netflix)
 Silicon Valley (HBO)
 Veep (HBO)
| style="vertical-align:top;" width="50%" | 
 Breaking Bad (AMC) Downton Abbey (PBS)
 Game of Thrones (HBO)
 House of Cards (Netflix)
 Mad Men (AMC)
 True Detective (HBO)|-
| style="vertical-align:top;" width="50%" | 
 The Colbert Report (Comedy Central)
 The Daily Show with Jon Stewart (Comedy Central)
 Jimmy Kimmel Live! (ABC)
 Real Time with Bill Maher (HBO)
 Saturday Night Live (NBC)
 The Tonight Show Starring Jimmy Fallon (NBC)
| style="vertical-align:top;" width="50%" | 
 'Fargo (FX) American Horror Story: Coven (FX)
 Bonnie & Clyde (A&E)
 Luther (BBC America)
 Treme (HBO)
 The White Queen (Starz)
|-
| style="vertical-align:top;" width="50%" | 
 The Normal Heart (HBO) Killing Kennedy (Nat Geo)
 Muhammad Ali's Greatest Fight (HBO)
 Sherlock: His Last Vow (PBS)
 The Trip to Bountiful (Lifetime)
| style="vertical-align:top;" width="50%" | 
 The Amazing Race (CBS)' Dancing with the Stars (ABC)
 Project Runway (Lifetime)
 So You Think You Can Dance (Fox)
 Top Chef (Bravo)
 The Voice (NBC)
|}

Acting

Lead performances

Supporting performances

Directing

Writing

Most major nominations
By network
 HBO – 39
 FX – 20
 CBS – 14
 Netflix / PBS – 11
 AMC / Showtime – 10
 ABC – 9
 NBC – 7
 Lifetime – 5
 BBC America – 4
 Fox – 3
 Comedy Central / IFC – 2

By program
 The Normal Heart (HBO) – 9
 American Horror Story: Coven (FX) / Fargo (FX) – 8
 Breaking Bad (AMC) – 7
 Downton Abbey (PBS) – 6

Most major awards
By network
 AMC / CBS / FX – 5
 HBO – 4
 ABC / PBS – 3

By program
 Breaking Bad (AMC) – 5
 Modern Family (ABC) / Sherlock: His Last Vow (PBS) – 3
 American Horror Story: Coven (FX) / Fargo'' (FX) – 2

Notes

Presenters and performers
The awards were presented by the following:

Presenters

Performers

In Memoriam
Sara Bareilles performed the song "Smile" during the "In Memoriam" segment of the awards ceremony:

 Ralph Waite
 Paul Walker
 Maximilian Schell
 Casey Kasem
 Abby Singer
 Meshach Taylor
 Robert Halmi Sr.
 Juanita Moore
 Sandy Frank
 Russell Johnson
 James Avery
 Daniel Blatt
 Sandi Fullerton
 Hank Rieger
 Paul Mazursky
 Ann B. Davis
 Eli Wallach
 Lucy Hood
 Hal Cooper
 Michael Filerman
 Alan Landsburg
 Philip Seymour Hoffman
 Peter O'Toole
 Mitzie Welch
 Don Pardo
 David Brenner
 Shirley Temple
 Efrem Zimbalist Jr.
 Carmen Zapata
 Hal Needham
 Sandy Grossman
 Ruby Dee
 Sheila MacRae
 Mickey Rooney
 Marcia Wallace
 Sid Caesar
 Harold Ramis
 Elaine Stritch
 Lauren Bacall
 James Garner
 Joan Fontaine
 Maya Angelou
 Bob Hoskins

After the last picture was shown, a special tribute to Robin Williams, who died on August 11, 2014, was presented by Billy Crystal.

Ratings
Despite its departure from its normal telecast schedule, the 66th Primetime Emmy Awards received 15.59 million viewers, the second-largest viewership in eight years.

Footnotes

References

External links
 Emmys.com list of 2014 Nominees & Winners
 Academy of Television Arts and Sciences website
 

066
2014 in American television
2014 in Los Angeles
2014 television awards
2014 awards in the United States
May 2014 events in the United States
Television shows directed by Glenn Weiss